Facundo Bernal Cruz (born 21 August 2003) is a Uruguayan professional footballer who plays as a midfielder for Defensor Sporting.

Career
Bernal is a youth academy graduate of Defensor Sporting. He made his professional debut for the club on 3 June 2021 in a 2–1 league win against Rocha.

Bernal is a Uruguayan youth international.

Career statistics

Honours
Defensor Sporting
 Copa Uruguay: 2022

References

External links
 

2003 births
Living people
Footballers from Montevideo
Association football midfielders
Uruguayan footballers
Uruguayan Primera División players
Uruguayan Segunda División players
Defensor Sporting players